Runcu Tauja (possibly from Quechua runku basket, tawqa pile, heap, "basket heap") is a mountain in the Vilcanota mountain range in the Andes of Peru, about  high. It is located in the Cusco Region, Canchis Province, Checacupe District, and in the Puno Region, Carabaya Province, Corani District.

References

Mountains of Peru
Mountains of Cusco Region
Mountains of Puno Region